Lazy Farmer is the 1975 album by British folk rock group Lazy Farmer. This short-lived group consisted of pioneer British folk musician Wizz Jones, his wife Sandy Jones, John Bidwell and Jake Walton. The album was dedicated to American banjo player John Burke, whose book "Fiddle Tunes for the Banjo" inspired the formation of Lazy Farmer. The album was recorded at Conny Plank's countryside studio in Cologne, Germany.

Track listing
"Lazy Farmer"  (Traditional)
"Standing Down in New York Town"  (Ralph McTell)
"Railroad Boy"  (Traditional)
"Soldier's Joy/Arkansas Traveller"  (Traditional/Sandford C. Faulkner)
"Turtle Dove"  (Traditional)
"John Lover's Gone"  (Traditional)
"Johnson Boys"  (Traditional)
"Love Song"  (Derroll Adams)
"The Cuckoo"  (Clarence Ashley/Hobart Smith)
"Sally in the Garden/Liberty"  (Traditional)
"Gypsy Davey" (Traditional/Woody Guthrie)
"When I Leave Berlin"  (Wizz Jones)

Personnel
Wizz Jones - acoustic guitar, vocals
Sandy Jones - banjo, vocals
John Bidwell - guitar, flue, flageolet, vocals
Jake Walton - guitar, dulcimer, hurdy-gurdy, vocals
Don Coging - banjo

Production
Producer: Carsten Linde/Wizz Jones
Recording Engineer: Conny Plank
Cover Design: Jerken Diederich/Annette Welke
Photography: Fern Mehring

References

Wizz Jones albums
1975 debut albums